Międzychód is a town in Międzychód County Greater Poland Voivodeship (west-central Poland).

Międzychód may also refer to:

Międzychód County
Międzychód, Śrem County in Greater Poland Voivodeship (west-central Poland)
Międzychód, Warmian-Masurian Voivodeship (north Poland)